Lidia Barbieri Sacconaghi (1 January 1945 – 11 April 2002) was an Italian alpine skier. She competed in three events at the 1964 Winter Olympics.

References

External links
 

1945 births
2002 deaths
Italian female alpine skiers
Olympic alpine skiers of Italy
Alpine skiers at the 1964 Winter Olympics
Alpine skiers from Milan